Eremophila pantonii, commonly known as broombush, is a flowering plant in the figwort family, Scrophulariaceae and is endemic to Western Australia. It is a broom-shaped shrub with narrow leaves which have a hooked tip, and blue or purple, sometimes white flowers in winter and spring.

Description
Most above-ground parts of the plant, except for the petals are covered with yellowish to grey, circular scales. The branches are also covered with raised, warty lumps and are reddish-brown in colour.

The petal tube is lilac-coloured or purple, rarely white, and white with yellow to brown spots on the inside. The outer surface of the petal tube and lobes is covered with branched hairs and the inside of the tube is hairy. The 4 stamens are fully enclosed in the petal tube.

Taxonomy and naming 
The species was first formally described by Ferdinand von Mueller in 1882 and the description was published in Southern Science Record. The specific epithet (pantonii) honours Joseph Anderson Panton, "in recognition of that gentleman's exertions through many years for promoting the pastoral interests and indeed also the general geography of Australia".

Distribution and habitat
Broombush is a widespread and common species between Laverton and Carnarvon in the Avon Wheatbelt, Carnarvon, Coolgardie, Gascoyne, Geraldton Sandplains, Great Victoria Desert, Murchison and Yalgoo biogeographic regions where it grows in a range of soils on flat areas or stony hills, often in or near mulga woodland.

Ecology
One of the pollinators of broombush is the native bee Euhesma leonora (Order Hymenoptera, Family Colletidae).

Conservation
This species is classified as "not threatened" by the Western Australian Government Department of Parks and Wildlife.

Use in horticulture
The silvery-grey foliage and massed display of pale lilac to purple flowers of this eremophila recommend it as a feature plant in a garden or as a contrast with shrubs with darker leaves. It is a hardy shrub which has been grown in most Australian states with some specimens over 30 years old. It can be propagated from seed, cuttings or by grafting onto Myoporum rootstock and grows will in a range of soils, including clay. It grows in full sun or partial shade, is very drought and frost tolerant and can be lightly pruned to keep it compact.

References

Eudicots of Western Australia
pantonii
Endemic flora of Western Australia
Plants described in 1882
Taxa named by Ferdinand von Mueller